The International Journal of Web Services Research (IJWSR) is a quarterly peer-reviewed academic journal covering web services. It was established in 2004 and is published by IGI Global. The editor-in-chief is Liang-Jie Zhang (Kingdee International Software Group in China and The Open Group).

Abstracting and indexing
The journal is abstracted and indexed in:

References

External links

Publications established in 2004
English-language journals
Quarterly journals
Web Services Research, International Journal of
Computer science journals
Web services